Irvin Antonio Valdéz Hernández (born February 10, 1991, in Quezaltepeque, Chalatenango, El Salvador) is a Salvadoran professional footballer who plays as a forward.

References

1991 births
Living people
Salvadoran footballers
El Salvador international footballers
C.D. Juventud Independiente players
Association football forwards